Moreton Jeffries (or Moreton Jefferies) is a hamlet in the English county of Herefordshire. It is situated off the A465 between Stoke Lacy and Burley Gate,  approximately 8½ miles north-east of Hereford. It has a medieval church, which has been designated by English Heritage as a Grade II* listed building, and is under the care of the Churches Conservation Trust. In the Domesday Book, it was listed as being in the Radlow Hundred. Henry 'Harry' Morgan, founder of the Morgan Motor Company, was born in Moreton Jeffries Rectory in 1881. There are timber merchants in the hamlet.

See also
Moreton Jeffries Church

Villages in Herefordshire